The Irish League in season 1972–73 comprised 12 teams, and Crusaders won the championship.

League standings

Results

References
Northern Ireland - List of final tables (RSSSF)

NIFL Premiership seasons
1972–73 in Northern Ireland association football
North